Popowice may refer to the following places in Poland:
Popowice, Lower Silesian Voivodeship (south-west Poland)
Popowice, Kuyavian-Pomeranian Voivodeship (north-central Poland)
Popowice, Łódź Voivodeship (central Poland)
Popowice, Lesser Poland Voivodeship (south Poland)
Popowice, Świętokrzyskie Voivodeship (south-central Poland)
Popowice, Masovian Voivodeship (east-central Poland)
Popowice, Pomeranian Voivodeship (north Poland)
Popowice, Lubusz Voivodeship (west Poland)